Twyman is an English surname. Notable people with the surname include:

Frank Twyman (1876–1959), British designer of optical instruments, co-inventor of the Twyman–Green interferometer
Jack Twyman (1934–2012), American basketball player and sports broadcaster
Jaylen Twyman (born 1999), American football player
Kathryn Twyman (born 1987), Canadian rower
Luska Twyman (1913–1988), American politician from Kentucky
Michael Twyman (born 1934), British academic
Robert Twyman (1897–1976), U.S. Representative from Illinois
William Anthony Twyman, who gave his name to the Twyman's law

References 

English-language surnames